Black Crescent Mountain is a mountain in the Crescent Range of the White Mountains,  north of Randolph and  southwest of Berlin in New Hampshire. The summit is on the eastern boundary of the White Mountain National Forest.

References

Mountains of Coös County, New Hampshire
Mountains of New Hampshire